The Minister for Climate Change and Energy is a portfolio in the Government of Australia. The current Minister is Chris Bowen. The minister administers his or her portfolios through the Department of Climate Change, Energy, the Environment and Water (established on 1 July 2022.). 

The portfolio is a federal ministerial portfolio responsible for the coordination and implementation of sustainable energy policies by the Australian Government. These policy areas include the mitigation of greenhouse gas emissions, the promotion of energy efficiency, as well as adaptations to climate change within domestic and international contexts.
The post was first held by Rex Connor in 1972 as Minister for Minerals and Energy.

History 
The precursor to the department was led by Secretary Blair Comley who reported to the Minister for Climate Change and Energy Efficiency, Greg Combet. The Minister was assisted by the Secretary for Climate Change and Energy Efficiency, Mark Dreyfus. The Clean Energy Regulator was an associated statutory authority formed on 2 April 2012.

On 25 March 2013, the responsibility for Climate Change policy passed to the newly formed Department of Industry, Innovation, Climate Change, Science, Research and Tertiary Education, and the duties of the Ministry of Energy passed to the Department of Resources, Energy and Tourism. Following the 2013 Australian federal election the responsibility for energy was shifted to the Minister for Industry, Innovation and Science under the Abbott Government.

After the 2016 Australian federal election, the responsibilities were passed to the Minister of the Environment and Energy under the Turnbull Government. Following the appointment of Scott Morrison as prime minister in August 2018, Josh Frydenberg was elevated to Treasurer of Australia, whereby Frydenberg's previous ministerial positions were separated, with Melissa Price as Minister of the Environment and Angus Taylor as Minister for Energy.

On 1 February 2020, An Administrative Arrangements Order (AAOs) was executed by the Australian Government. This order required small business and energy functions be passed to the renamed Department of Industry, Science, Energy and Resources.

Objectives 
The department deals with:

 Development and coordination of domestic and international climate change policy
 International climate change negotiations
 Design and implementation of emissions trading
 Mandatory renewable energy target policy, regulation, and co-ordination
 Greenhouse emissions and energy consumption reporting
 Climate change adaptation strategy and co-ordination
 Co-ordination of climate change science activities

List of energy ministers
The following individuals have been appointed as energy minister, or any of its precedent titles:

List of ministers for climate change
The Minister for Climate Change is responsible for developing climate change (global warming) solutions, mitigating greenhouse gas emissions, and promoting energy efficiency. The following individuals have been appointed to the post, or any of its precursor titles:

List of Assistant Ministers for Climate Change and Energy
The following individuals have been appointed as Assistant Minister for Climate Change and Energy, or any of its precedent titles:

See also

 Carbon tax in Australia
 List of Australian Commonwealth Government entities

References

External links
 

Australia
Australia
Climate Change and Energy